Copernican means of or pertaining to the astronomer Nicolaus Copernicus (1473–1543).

Copernican may also refer to:

Science
 Copernican heliocentrism, the astronomical model developed by Copernicus
 Copernican principle, in physical cosmology
 Copernican period, in lunar geology

Politics
 Copernican federalism, a US political model
 Copernican paradigm, an Australian political model

Music
 Symphony No. 2 (Górecki), a symphony by Henryk Górecki known as the Copernican Symphony, Op. 31

See also
Copernicus (disambiguation)